Barsalogho Airport  is a public use airport located near Barsalogho, Sanmatenga, Burkina Faso.  The single runway is unmarked except for the remains of the end marker at the north end and may be unusable.

See also
List of airports in Burkina Faso

References

External links 
 Official ASECNA Aeronautical Publication for Burkina Faso 
 Airport record for Barsalogho Airport at Landings.com

Airports in Burkina Faso
Sanmatenga Province